Sabaudiella is a genus of ammonites. It was described by Vasicek and Hoedemaeker in 2003, and the type species is S. sabaudianus, which was originally assigned to the genus Ancyloceras by Pictet and de Loriol in 1858. A new species, S. riverorum, which existed during the early Barremian of what is now Argentina, was described by Beatriz Aguirre-Urreta and Peter F. Rawson in 2012.

Sabaudiella is also a genus of plants in family convolvulaceae.

Species
 Sabaudiella sabaudianus (Pictet & de Loriol, 1858)
 Sabaudiella riverorum Aguirre-Urreta & Rawson, 2012

References

External links
 Sabaudiella at the Paleobiology Database

Ammonite genera
Fossil taxa described in 2003